Deshwasi is a 1991 (released on April 5) Bollywood drama film directed by Rajiv Goswami and released under the banner of V.I.P. Films Combines. It stars Manoj Kumar, Anupam Kher, Hema Malini and Poonam Dhillon.

Story
Unhappy with India's independence from the British, Raja Shamsher Singh and his goons initially attempt to put their candidate, Shishupal, up for elections.

Cast
 Manoj Kumar as Sangraam Singh
 Poonam Dhillon as Rakshya
 Hema Malini as Bharati
 Anupam Kher as Samsher Singh
 Mandakini as Maryada
 Suresh Oberoi as Pratap Singh
 Om Shivpuri as Thakur Kripal Singh
 Satish Shah as Shishupal
 Kamini Kaushal
 Tom Alter
 Bharat Kapoor

Soundtrack
The film's music was composed by Laxmikant Pyarelal, with lyrics by Anand Bakshi.

References

External links

1991 films
1990s Hindi-language films
Films scored by Laxmikant–Pyarelal
Indian drama films